The 1971 England rugby union tour of the Far East was a series of matches played between September and October by an English national selection in Asia, as part of the RFU's centenary celebrations. None of the six international matches on this tour were given official Test status, with England playing as England XV, No "caps" were awarded to the English players who took part on the tour. 

The first match against Japan was played at the Kintetsu Hanazono Rugby Stadium, in Osaka, on the Friday, 24 September 1971, (Vernal Equinox Day, a public holiday in Japan), in front of a crowd of 13,000.  The Japanese side was captained by 30 year old Akira Yokoi and coached by Tetsunosuke Onishi. England struggled to overcome Japan in the match, despite outscoring the home side five tries to two (tries were still worth four points). The match was level at 19-19 with three minutes to go before tries from right wing Peter Glover in the 37th minute and centre Jeremy Janion in the 38th minute gave the English XV a 27-19 victory.

The second match of the series held under lights at the Chichibunomiya Rugby Stadium in Tokyo on Tuesday, 28 September 1971, before 25,000 people, was even closer than the previous game. At halftime neither side had scored a try, but England crept out to a halftime lead of 6-0, with two penalties scored by fullback Peter Rossborough. Japan then came back hard in the second half, getting three points of their own, with a penalty scored by flanker Yoshiharu Yamaguchi. One of the Japanese centres, Koji Miyata, was tackled just three yards from the try line but the visitors eventually held out for a 6-3 win.

Results 

Scores and results list England's points tally first.

England
tour
tour
England national rugby union team tours
1971 in Asian sport